Rio Novo do Sul is a municipality located in the Brazilian state of Espírito Santo. Its population was 11,626 (2020) and its area is 204 km2.  The name of this municipality means "New River of the South" in Portuguese.

References

Municipalities in Espírito Santo